Cody Taylor Hall (born May 31, 1991) is an American professional wrestler.  He is best known for working for New Japan Pro-Wrestling (NJPW), where he was a member of the Bullet Club stable. Hall is a second generation wrestler, as the son of the late Scott Hall.

Early life
Hall was born to Scott Hall and Dana Lee Burgio in 1991 and has a sister, Cassidy. He considers fellow professional wrestlers Kevin Nash and Sean Waltman as uncles due to them being close friends of his father.

Hall was a member of the United States Air Force and served an active duty service commitment with the 460th Security Forces Squadron at Buckley Air Force Base in Colorado. Hall departed to become a professional wrestler.

Professional wrestling career

Early career (2012–2014)
Hall began to train as a professional wrestler in 2010 with his father, as he wanted to follow in his footsteps. Hall's first match took place on July 14, 2012, in Belleview Pro Wrestling, defeating Josh Hess. In the following years, Hall worked in various promotions, usually in tag matches with Kevin Nash or Sean Waltman, both Scott Hall's friends. On November 15, 2014, at Superstars of Wrestling 2, Hall won the Superstars of Wrestling Championship after defeating Tim Zbyszko in a ladder match. In 2014, Hall won the Georgia Heavyweight Championship from Southern Fried Championship Wrestling.

New Japan Pro-Wrestling (2015–2017)

In January 2015, Hall began training at the New Japan Pro-Wrestling dojo. On January 5 at New Year Dash!!, Hall debuted as Bullet Club's personal "young boy" trainee. Hall made his NJPW in-ring debut on February 2, teaming with his stablemates Doc Gallows, Karl Anderson, Kenny Omega and Yujiro Takahashi in a ten-man tag team main event, where they were defeated by Captain New Japan, Hirooki Goto, Katsuyori Shibata, Ryusuke Taguchi and Hiroshi Tanahashi, who pinned him for the win. As is usually the case with "young boys" in Japan, Hall would lose many of his first matches with NJPW, and often be pinned in multi-man tag matches, but achieved his first victory on April 29 at Wrestling Hinokuni in a tag team match, where he and Yujiro Takahashi defeated Captain New Japan and Satoshi Kojima. Hall, however, was not involved in the finish of the match. Over the next year, Hall mainly worked tag team matches with his Bullet Club stablemates, while also becoming an enforcer for The Young Bucks (Matt Jackson and Nick Jackson). Hall scored his first win himself on April 2, 2016, when he submitted rookie Hirai Kawato in a singles match. Hall was injured later that month at Invasion Attack 2016, and remained sidelined until January 2017, when his profile was quietly removed from NJPW's roster page, signaling his departure from the promotion.

Pro Wrestling Noah (2017–2019) 
On March 13, 2017, the Japanese Pro Wrestling Noah promotion announced that Hall would start working regularly for the promotion on April 11. The following month, Hall teamed with Randy Reign in the 2017 Global Tag League, finishing with a record of four wins and three losses, failing to advance to the finals. During the tournament, Hall and Reign defeated eventual tournament winners and reigning GHC Tag Team Champions Maybach Taniguchi and Naomichi Marufuji, making them the number one contenders to Taniguchi and Marufuji. Hall and Reign received their title shot on June 4, but were defeated by Taniguchi and Marufuji. On October 1, Hall unsuccessfully challenged Eli Drake for the GFW Global Championship.

On February 24, 2019, Cody wrestled his final match for Noah.

DDT Pro-Wrestling (2019–2020) 
In 2019, Cody Hall began to work for the Japanese DDT Pro-Wrestling

Major League Wrestling (2020) 
On December 4, 2020, Major League Wrestling announced that Hall had been signed to the company, however, the next day he was released from his contract.

Championships and accomplishments

Cincy Wrestling
Cincy Wrestling Championship (1 time)
European Wrestling Promotion
EWP Junior Championship (1 time)
Independent Pro Wrestling Germany
IPW International German Championship (1 time)
Pro Wrestling Illustrated
Ranked No. 317 of the top 500 singles wrestlers in the PWI 500 in 2018
Southern Fried Championship Wrestling
SFCW Georgia Heavyweight Championship (1 time)
Superstars of Wrestling
SOW Championship (1 time)

References

External links
 
 

1991 births
American male professional wrestlers
American expatriate sportspeople in Japan
Living people
People from Seminole, Florida
People from St. Mary's County, Maryland
Professional wrestlers from Florida
Expatriate professional wrestlers in Japan
Bullet Club members